Hot Springs Hotel and Brewery was a Utah Pony Express station, inn and brewery founded in 1856 by Porter Rockwell at Point of the Mountain, modern-day Bluffdale, Utah. It was a contract Pony Express station, ten miles south of Trader's Rest station. Rockwell is known historically as the bodyguard of early Mormon leader and Utah settler Brigham Young. The brewery was Utah's first and at its peak made 500 gallons of beer a day.

In October 1934, a memorial marker was placed in Bluffdale, incorporating stones from the inn's stable. It was moved at a later date to the present location on Pony Express Road.

See also
List of breweries, wineries, and distilleries in Utah

Footnotes

References

 (section 2a)

External links
Utah Pony Express stations
Timeline of Porter Rockwell's Life, City of Lehi government
Rockwell Station record, Markers and monuments database, Utah Division of State History (1995)
Google Maps 360º view of monument
 

1856 establishments in Utah Territory
Defunct brewery companies of the United States
Pony Express stations